The Sunbeam (also known as the Solent Sunbeam) is a type of keelboat sailed frequently at Itchenor Sailing Club and Falmouth. It was designed by Alfred Westmacott in 1923 as an improved version of the Mermaid.

References

External links
 Solent Sunbeam Class Page

Keelboats
One-design sailing classes